Turbo was a brand of chewing gum, produced by Turkish company Kent from late 1980s to 2007. Turbo's inserts, which featured the images of various vehicles, were a collectable fad from late 1980s to 1990s.

A new Turbo gum came in 2015; and in 2018 the Turbo gum received an update. It was available in Poland and Romania in 2015.

References

External links
Turbo insert collecting website 
Turbo insert gallery

Chewing gum
1990s fads and trends
Turkish brands